Cyber spying, cyber espionage, or cyber-collection is the act or practice of obtaining secrets and information without the permission and knowledge of the holder of the information from individuals, competitors, rivals, groups, governments and enemies for personal, economic, political or military advantage using methods on the Internet, networks or individual computers through the use of proxy servers, cracking techniques and malicious software including Trojan horses and spyware. It may wholly be perpetrated online from computer desks of professionals on bases in far away countries or may involve infiltration at home by computer trained conventional spies and moles or in other cases may be the criminal handiwork of amateur malicious hackers and software programmers.

History 
Cyber spying started as far back as 1996, when widespread deployment of Internet connectivity to government and corporate systems gained momentum.  Since that time, there have been numerous cases of such activities.

Details
Cyber spying typically involves the use of such access to secrets and classified information or control of individual computers or whole networks for a strategic advantage and for psychological, political and physical subversion activities and sabotage.  More recently, cyber spying involves analysis of public activity on social networking sites like Facebook and Twitter.

Such operations, like non-cyber espionage, are typically illegal in the victim country while fully supported by the highest level of government in the aggressor country. The ethical situation likewise depends on one's viewpoint, particularly one's opinion of the governments involved.

Platforms and functionality
Cyber-collection tools have been developed by governments and private interests for nearly every computer and smart-phone operating system.  Tools are known to exist for Microsoft, Apple, and Linux computers and iPhone, Android, Blackberry, and Windows phones. Major manufacturers of Commercial off-the-shelf (COTS) cyber collection technology include Gamma Group from the UK and Hacking Team from Italy. Bespoke cyber-collection tool companies, many offering COTS packages of zero-day exploits, include Endgame, Inc. and Netragard of the United States and Vupen from France.  State intelligence agencies often have their own teams to develop cyber-collection tools, such as Stuxnet, but require a constant source of zero-day exploits in order to insert their tools into newly targeted systems.  Specific technical details of these attack methods often sells for six figure sums.

Common functionality of cyber-collection systems include:
Data scan: local and network storage are scanned to find and copy files of interest, these are often documents, spreadsheets, design files such as Autocad files and system files such as the passwd file.
Capture location: GPS, WiFi, network information and other attached sensors are used to determine the location and movement of the infiltrated device
Bug: the device microphone can be activated in order to record audio.  Likewise, audio streams intended for the local speakers can be intercepted at the device level and recorded.
 Hidden Private Networks that bypass the corporate network security.  A compute that is being spied upon can be plugged into a legitimate corporate network that is heavy monitored for malware activity and at same time belongs to a private wifi network outside of the company network that is leaking confidential information off of an employee's computer.  A computer like this is easily set up by a double-agent working in the IT department by install a second Wireless card in a computer and special software to remotely monitor an employee's computer through this second interface card without them being aware of a side-band communication channel pulling information off of his computer.
Camera: the device cameras can be activated in order to covertly capture images or video.   
Keylogger and Mouse Logger: the malware agent can capture each keystroke, mouse movement and click that the target user makes.  Combined with screen grabs, this can be used to obtain passwords that are entered using a virtual on-screen keyboard.
Screen Grabber: the malware agent can take periodic screen capture images.  In addition to showing sensitive information that may not be stored on the machine, such as e-banking balances and encrypted web mail, these can be used in combination with the key and mouse logger data to determine access credentials for other Internet resources. 
Encryption: Collected data is usually encrypted at the time of capture and may be transmitted live or stored for later exfiltration.  Likewise, it is common practice for each specific operation to use specific encryption and poly-morphic capabilities of the cyber-collection agent in order to ensure that detection in one location will not compromise others.
Bypass Encryption: Because the malware agent operates on the target system with all the access and rights of the user account of the target or system administrator, encryption is bypassed.  For example, interception of audio using the microphone and audio output devices enables the malware to capture to both sides of an encrypted Skype call.
Exfiltration: Cyber-collection agents usually exfiltrate the captured data in a discrete manner, often waiting for high web traffic and disguising the transmission as secure web browsing.  USB flash drives have been used to exfiltrate information from air gap protected systems.  Exfiltration systems often involve the use of reverse proxy systems that anonymize the receiver of the data.
Replicate: Agents may replicate themselves onto other media or systems, for example an agent may infect files on a writable network share or install themselves onto USB drives in order to infect computers protected by an air gap or otherwise not on the same network.
Manipulate Files and File Maintenance: Malware can be used to erase traces of itself from log files.  It can also download and install modules or updates as well as data files.  This function may also be used to place "evidence" on the target system, e.g. to insert child pornography onto the computer of a politician or to manipulate votes on an electronic vote counting machine.
Combination Rules: Some agents are very complex and are able to combine the above features in order to provide very targeted intelligence collection capabilities.  For example, the use of GPS bounding boxes and microphone activity can be used to turn a smart phone into a smart bug that intercepts conversations only within the office of a target.
Compromised cellphones. Since, modern cellphones are increasingly similar to general purpose computer, these cellphones are vulnerable to the same cyber-collect attacks as computer systems, and are vulnerable to leak extremely sensitive conversational and location information to an attackers.  Leaking of cellphone GPS location and conversational information to an attacker has been reported in a number of recent cyber stalking cases where the attacker was able to use the victim's GPS location to call nearby businesses and police authorities to make false allegations against the victim depending on his location, this can range from telling the restaurant staff information to tease the victim, or making false witness against the victim.  For instance if the victim were parked in large parking lot the attackers may call and state that they saw drug or violence activity going on with a description of the victim and directions to their GPS location.

Infiltration
There are several common ways to infect or access the target:
An Injection Proxy is a system that is placed upstream from the target individual or company, usually at the Internet service provider, that injects malware into the targets system.  For example, an innocent download made by the user can be injected with the malware executable on the fly so that the target system then is accessible to the government agents.
Spear Phishing: A carefully crafted e-mail is sent to the target in order to entice them to install the malware via a Trojan document or a drive by attack hosted on a web server compromised or controlled by the malware owner.
Surreptitious Entry may be used to infect a system.  In other words, the spies carefully break into the target's residence or office and install the malware on the target's system.
An Upstream monitor or sniffer is a device that can intercept and view the data transmitted by a target system.  Usually this device is placed at the Internet service provider.  The Carnivore system developed by the U.S. FBI is a famous example of this type of system.  Based on the same logic as a telephone intercept, this type of system is of limited use today due to the widespread use of encryption during data transmission.  
A wireless infiltration system can be used in proximity of the target when the target is using wireless technology.  This is usually a laptop based system that impersonates a WiFi or 3G base station to capture the target systems and relay requests upstream to the Internet. Once the target systems are on the  network, the system then functions as an Injection Proxy or as an Upstream Monitor in order to infiltrate or monitor the target system.
A USB Key preloaded with the malware infector may be given to or dropped at the target site.

Cyber-collection agents are usually installed by payload delivery software constructed using zero-day attacks and delivered via infected USB drives, e-mail attachments or malicious web sites.  State sponsored cyber-collections efforts have used official operating system certificates in place of relying on security vulnerabilities.  In the Flame operation, Microsoft states that the Microsoft certificate used to impersonate a Windows Update was forged; however, some experts believe that it may have been acquired through HUMINT efforts.

Examples of operations
 Stuxnet
 Flame
 Duqu
 Bundestrojaner
 Rocra
 Operation High Roller
 Cozy Bear: a well-resourced, highly dedicated and organized cyber espionage group that F-Secure believes has been working for the Russian Federation since at least 2008.

See also 

 Chaos Computer Club
 Chinese intelligence operations in the United States
 Computer security
 Computer surveillance
 Cyber-security regulation
 Cyber spying on universities
 Cyber threat intelligence
 Cyberwarfare
 Employee monitoring software
 GhostNet
 Industrial espionage
 Proactive Cyber Defence
 Stalkerware
 Surveillance
 Titan Rain

References

Sources

External links
 Congress to Investigate Google Charges Of Chinese Internet Spying (AHN)
 Archive of Information Warfare Monitor - Tracking Cyberpower (University of Toronto, Canada/Munk Centre)

Cybercrime
Cyberwarfare
Spyware
Types of espionage
Military intelligence collection
Computer security procedures
Hacking (computer security)
Information sensitivity
Mass intelligence-gathering systems
National security
Sabotage
Security engineering
Social engineering (computer security)
Computing terminology